Wong Tsz Chung (Chinese: 王子聰; born 16 June 1995 in Hong Kong) is a Hong Kong professional footballer who currently plays as a goalkeeper for Hong Kong Premier League club Sham Shui Po.

Club career
Wong started his senior career with Sun Hei in 2013. 

In 2015, he signed for Pegasus. He made his professional debut at the club in the Hong Kong FA Cup match against Wanchai on 3 February 2016.

After that, he played for Yuen Long and Lee Man.

In 2018, he joined Kitchee.

In November 2020, he was loaned to Sham Shui Po.

In March 2021, he officially joined Sham Shui Po.

References

External links
 HKFA

Hong Kong footballers
Association football goalkeepers
1995 births
Living people
Hong Kong First Division League players
Hong Kong Premier League players
Sun Hei SC players
TSW Pegasus FC players
Yuen Long FC players
Lee Man FC players
Kitchee SC players
Sham Shui Po SA players
 Alumni of the University of Hong Kong